Abyss may refer to:

 Abyss (religion), a bottomless pit, or a passage to the underworld

Film and television 
 The Abyss (1910 film), a Danish silent film starring Asta Nielsen
 The Abyss (1988 film) (L'Œuvre au noir), a French-Belgian film
 The Abyss, a 1989 film directed by James Cameron
 Abyss (TV series), a 2019 South Korean television series

Episodes
 "The Abyss" (Captain Power and the Soldiers of the Future)
 "The Abyss" (Entourage)
 "Abyss" (Stargate SG-1)

Games 
 Abyss (Dungeons & Dragons), a plane of the Dungeons & Dragons roleplaying games
 Abyss (Flying Buffalo), a 1980 role-playing game adventure for Tunnels & Trolls
 Abyss (magazine), a defunct gaming magazine
 Abyss, a flight map in Aion
 Abyss, the final boss character of Marvel vs. Capcom 2
 Abyss or Zasalamel, a character in Soulcalibur III
 "The Abyss", a content update for No Man's Sky
 "The Abyss", an area in the video game Hollow Knight
 "The Abyss", an area in the video game Dark Souls
 "The Abyss Order", a faction within the video game Genshin Impact

Literature and comics 
 The Abyss (Card novel), by Orson Scott Card, a novelization of the 1989 James Cameron film
 The Abyss (Yourcenar novel), a 1968 historical novel by Marguerite Yourcenar
 Abyss (Weddle and Lang novel), a 2001 Star Trek novel
 Abyss (Denning novel), a 2009 Star Wars novel
 "The Abyss", a 1941 horror short story by Robert A. W. Lowndes
 Abyss (comics), various characters in the Marvel Universe
 The Abyss, a supernatural prison in the Japanese anime/manga Pandora Hearts
 The Abyss, the titular setting of the Japanese anime/manga Made in Abyss

Music 
 The Abyss (band), an American alternative rock band
 The Abyss (musical project), a black metal side project of the Swedish death metal band Hypocrisy
 The Abyss (recording studio), a recording studio owned by Swedish musician Peter Tägtgren
 Abyss, the talent agency that represents the South Korean performing artist Sandara Park

Albums 
 Abyss (Chelsea Wolfe album) or the title song, 2015
 Abyss (Lionsheart album) or the title song, 2004
 Abyss (Unleash the Archers album) or the title song, 2020

Songs 
 "Abyss", a song by Circus Maximus from Isolate
 "Abyss", a song by Jin
 "Abyss", a song by Stratovarius from Dreamspace
 "Abyss", a song by The-Dream from Love King
 "The Abyss", a song by Accept from Blood of the Nations
 "The Abyss", a song by Sepultura from Schizophrenia

Other uses 
 Abyss (roller coaster), at Adventure World in Perth, Western Australia
 Abyss (Thelema), a spiritual principle within the system of Thelema
 Abyss (wrestler) (born 1973), ring name of professional wrestler Chris Park
 AUV Abyss, an autonomous underwater research vehicle
 "The Abyss", an episode of the Canadian podcast Someone Knows Something

See also 
 Abysmal, a 2015 album by The Black Dahlia Murder
 "Abysmal", a song by The Haunted from Revolver
 Abyssal plain, a flat area on the ocean floor
 Abyssal zone, a deep extent of the sea
 Into the Abyss (disambiguation)